Executive education (ExEd or Exec. Ed) refers to academic programs at graduate-level business schools for executives, business leaders and functional managers globally. These programs are generally non-credit and non-degree-granting, but sometimes lead to certificates and some offer continuing education units accepted by professional bodies and institutes. Estimates by Business Week magazine suggest that executive education in the United States is approximately an $800 million annual business with approximately 80% provided by university-based business schools. Many traditionally upper tier schools offer these programs as well as business schools and other academic institutions. 

Customized programs, which are tailored for and offered to executives of a single company, represent the fastest-growing segment of the market. Customized programs help organizations increase management capability by combining the science of business and performance management into specialized programs that enable executives to develop new knowledge, skills and attitudes.  Research shows that a firm with a clearly articulated and understood business and capability strategy will have a higher market-to-book value than a firm that does not.

Open enrollment programs are also available as part of university-based executive education offerings, which occur throughout the year on selected dates, and are available to participants from different companies and organizations.

Shorter executive education programs tend to focus on specific roles or industries, or on improving specific leadership skills, such as persuasion, negotiation, team building or communication.

Some executive education providers offer more comprehensive management training options, such as the modular Advanced Management Program (AMP) offered independently by several business schools.

Not all observers of university-based executive education are positive. There is some debate about the nature of business school education as a form of professional development. Some believe that university-based executive education has caused some business schools to "lose track of their professional mission." This argument is made by Rakesh Khurana among others.

History
The genesis of executive education can be traced to Frederick Taylor and his 1911 treatise Principles of Scientific Management. This book described how the application of the scientific method to the management of workers could improve productivity. Taylor's ideas, also known as "Taylorism" would become the standard for businesses worldwide.

On the heels of Taylorism came The Alfred P. Sloan School of Management, which in 1914 began offering Course XV, Engineering Administration, at the Massachusetts Institute of Technology. At that time, the concept of providing business training in the academic environment was gaining popularity, thus MIT created a program “specially designed to train men to be competent managers of businesses that have much to do with engineering problems.” Harvard also began offering short five-week selections of standard MBA material in the late 1920s.

In 1930 Course XV at MIT became an independent department and was named the Department of Business and Engineering Administration. In 1931 an innovative program for executive development was initiated with the backing of several industrialists. This one-year program — offering graduate study in the fundamentals of management and decision-making — was aimed at young managers who were nominated by their employers and was highly competitive. In 1938 the program received full funding from the Alfred P. Sloan Foundation and was formally named the MIT Sloan Fellowship Program for Executive Development at MIT.

Executive Education in the United States developed critical mass after World War II. The Servicemen's Readjustment Act of 1944 — commonly known as the GI Bill of Rights — allowed veterans to take advantage of education benefits.  Many studied business in college, a privilege previously only enjoyed by the wealthy. Subsequent executive education programs, including the 13-week Advanced Management Program at Harvard University and the four-week Institute for Management at Northwestern University's School of Commerce (now the Kellogg School of Management), developed in response to the need to rapidly train line executives for general management in the post World War II era.

By the late 1970s, nearly 20 business schools in the United States were offering some form of executive education. The science of business also was developing at a rapid pace as faculty, such as Michael Porter (Harvard ) and C. K. Prahalad (University of Michigan), published academic papers that changed the way people thought and acted within companies.

Prahalad is most notably remembered for developing the concepts of “core competencies” and “strategic intent”. These and other respected academic business thinkers — Don Hambrick, Ram Charan, David Ulrich, Michael Hammer, Gary Hamel and many others — are the true pioneers of executive education and the ongoing effort to facilitate wealth creation and other new concepts aimed at making stronger businesses while improving the welfare of the world.

Throughout the 1970s university-based executive education continued to evolve as an industry. Several on-campus residential facilities were constructed at several universities, demonstrating the value of a standalone facility dedicated to executive education programs. This spurred the development of such facilities at schools nationwide and the subsequent expansion of short open enrollment programs. The industry's exclusive professional association, The International University Consortium for Executive Education, also came into existence during this period. UNICON began sponsoring a tradeshow in the 1970s for companies interested in learning about university-based executive education and an annual conference for members. UNICON has since grown into a consortium of nearly 100 universities with executive education programs around the globe. It sponsors three annual conferences that allow members to share best practices, conducts research into topics of concern and provides benchmarking data for members.

Executive education further developed in the 1980s and 1990s as the increasing pace and scope of global business demanded higher levels of education among employees. The dot-com boom further changed the scope of the business landscape by favouring employees and organizations that were quick to adapt to change. As longstanding business concepts became obsolete, continual training was necessary – but earning a degree was not.

In a 1999 survey of 63 programs, the University of Michigan Business School topped the list. By the next survey in 2001, the number of programs had doubled to 121, with a doubling of revenues to $800M. Shortly after the survey, Executive education growth was dramatically impacted by travel restrictions and the economic impact of the September 11 attacks.

Current situation

The participation of many of the most prestigious universities around the world has enhanced the value of university-based executive education. Ongoing business challenges and opportunities – a dynamic economy, developing technologies, new business models and globalization – has made the emphasis on learning new concepts throughout ones career a necessity.

Despite the growing popularity of university-based executive education around the world, the global economic recession has slowed the industry's growth during the past few years. According to a 2011 study conducted by the Manchester Business School in partnership with Dubai International Academic City and Dubai Knowledge Village, the global economic downturn has had a negative impact on learning and development spending within the Middle East. More than half the respondents noted that spending on executive education had been “significantly” affected, while other organizations agreed that spending had been “somewhat” affected.

A return to higher participation appears to be coming as the economy shows more signs of improvement. A substantial portion of the organizations surveyed by Manchester Business School said they anticipate executive education spending to moderately increase during the next three years.

The situation is similar in other parts of the world according to a late 2010 state of the industry survey conducted by UNICON, which found that many prestigious universities with executive education programs around the world expect notably higher enrollment during 2011. Sixty-five percent of UNICON survey participants predicted increased participation in their open enrollment programs this year. Additionally, 78 percent of schools projected an increase in customized executive education programs during 2011. Nearly half of the schools surveyed indicated an increase in their number of programming days, now offering up to 39 weeks in open enrollment programs and an average of 49 weeks in custom programs. Slightly more than half also reported increasing the number of days that educational programs for executives are offered.

Rankings

Executive education rankings are carried out annually by the Financial Times and by Bloomberg BusinessWeek.

Ranking may be based on a variety of metrics such as diversity, faculty, revenue and participants.

See also

 Business education
 Business school
 List of business schools per country
 Corporate Education
 Executive MBA
 Leadership development
 Business acumen
 Organizational development

References

External links
Financial Times executive education
Database of all AACSB accredited open-enrollment courses

Master's degrees
Business education